Robert Felisiak (born 11 October 1962) is a German fencer. He won a gold medal in the team épée event at the 1992 Summer Olympics. He also competed for Poland (until 1987).

References

External links
 

1962 births
Living people
German male fencers
Polish male fencers
Olympic fencers of Germany
Fencers at the 1992 Summer Olympics
Olympic gold medalists for Germany
Olympic medalists in fencing
Sportspeople from Wrocław
Medalists at the 1992 Summer Olympics